Nihon Dempa Kogyo Co., Ltd. or   is one of the world's largest quartz crystal companies, based in Shibuya, Tokyo, Japan.

Using its synthetic quartz crystals, NDK produces crystal-related products such as crystal devices (e.g. crystal units, crystal oscillators, crystal filters) and ultrasonic transducers for medical use. In recent years, the company has begun to develop frequency synthesizers and low-power wireless modules.

History
1948 : NDK was established.
1950 : Started crystal unit production and sales.
1958 : Succeeded in test production of synthetic quartz crystal.
1959 : Started crystal filter production.
1960 : Started crystal oscillator production.
1963 : Began trading of NDK stock on the OTC market.
1979 : Developed and industrialized surface acoustic wave (SAW) filter.
1990 : Listed NDK stock on Second Section of the Tokyo Stock Exchange.
1998 : Listed on the First Section of the Tokyo Stock Exchange.
2009 : Pressure vessel in USA plant ruptured, killing 1 bystander.
2010: Fined $510K by OSHA for safety violations. 
2015 : USA plant demolished, with no plans to rebuild.

Products
Crystal Units
Crystal Oscillators
SPXO
TCXO
VCXO
OCXO
Crystal Filters
Surface Acoustic Wave (SAW) Devices
Optical Components
Synthetic Quartz Crystals
Ultrasonic Transducers
Frequency Synthesizers

Research and product development
Nihon Dempa Kogyo has developed a prototype crystal-based disease detector which diagnoses disease from breath. The system works by detecting trace amounts of odor-causing substances found in a person's breath.

Company locations
NDK has sales offices in Japan, China, France, Germany, Italy, Malaysia, Singapore, United Kingdom, and United States. NDK has production and engineering facilities in Japan, China, Germany, Malaysia, and the United States.

2009 Explosion

NDK's Belvidere, Illinois facility was heavily damaged in 2009 when one of the crystal autoclaves ruptured violently, causing an explosion. The explosion scattered debris over a wide area, with a 7-foot support beam striking and killing Ronald Greenfield of Chesterfield, Indiana, who was refueling at a nearby truck stop. Debris also damaged a nearby automotive supply company, injuring one worker. 
 The rupture was in a crystal-growth autoclave that had undergone stress corrosion cracking and was inadequately inspected; recommendations from a previous incident were ignored. As a result, the autoclave became overstressed and failed completely. After an investigation, OSHA fined NDK $510,000 for a history of ignoring safety recommendations. 
Demolition of the facility began in March 2015, with no plans to rebuild.

References

External links

  

Electronics companies of Japan
Companies based in Tokyo
Companies listed on the Tokyo Stock Exchange
Electronics companies established in 1948
Japanese companies established in 1948
Japanese brands
Defunct defense companies of Japan